Yu Delu (born 11 October 1987) is a former professional snooker player from the People's Republic of China. He is currently serving a 10 years and 9 months ban for match-fixing from 25 May 2018 until 24 February 2029. The ban was announced on 1 December 2018 after the result of a lengthy investigation.

Career

Early career
Yu made his first appearance at the China Open as a wild card in 2006. He defeated Andrew Norman, before losing to Graeme Dott in the last 32. He was awarded a wild card for every China Open event between 2006 and 2011, and for the first three Shanghai Masters events in 2007, 2008 and 2009.

He recorded a maximum break during a China Snooker Professional Tour event in ZhengZhou against Jin Long on 20 September 2009. This made him the first person to score a 147 on the China Professional Tour. However, it is not recorded by World Snooker Association.

Debut season
He was awarded a place on the 2011–12 professional Main Tour as a wildcard by World Snooker. In Yu's first ranking event qualifier, the Australian Goldfields Open he beat Michael White 5–4, Joe Swail 5–1 and Joe Jogia 5–2 before losing in the final qualifying round 5–0 to Ryan Day. Later in the season, he came through three qualifying matches to reach the wild-card round of the German Masters where he beat Chris Norbury 5–3. The result meant that he played in the main draw of a ranking event outside of China for the first time. Yu drew compatriot Ding Junhui in the last 32 and pulled off the result of his career to date as he won the first three frames before once again closing out the match 5–3. He couldn't replicate his form in the last 16, however, as he was beaten 2–5 by Stephen Lee.

Yu reached the final qualifying round in three of the last four ranking events, losing to Andrew Higginson in the World Open and to seven-time world champion Stephen Hendry in both the China Open and World Championship. He was therefore one of the Scot's last opponents before his retirement.

Yu also had a good season in the minor-ranking Players Tour Championship series as he played in 11 of the 12 events, picking up two quarter-finals and two last 16 finishes to be placed 34th on the PTC Order of Merit. He finished his debut season ranked world number 58, inside the top 64 who guarantee their places for the 2012–13 season. Yu was also the highest ranked out of all the new players on the tour.

2012/2013 season
Yu had a disappointing 2012/2013 season as he could not qualify for any of the ranking events. He played in nine of the ten Players Tour Championship during the year, with his best finishes being three last 32 defeats to see him placed 63rd on the Order of Merit. Yu did have an upturn in form in World Championship Qualifying, by defeating Ian Burns 10–2 and Jamie Burnett 10–6. His break of 140 against Burnett was the joint highest of his career to date and the second highest of the qualifying tournament. Yu faced Mark King, just one match away from reaching the Crucible for the first time, and led 8–6 and 9–8, but lost the 18th frame on the colours and the deciding frame to be defeated 9–10. His ranking increased 11 places during the year to end it at world number 47.

2013/2014 season
Yu lost in the first round of both the Indian Open and Shanghai Masters, before winning his first match in a ranking event at the UK Championship with a 6–3 victory over David Grace. His second round match against Matthew Stevens went into a deciding frame which lasted 40 minutes and hinged on a safety battle that Stevens won on the final pink. Yu played in all four of the Asian Tour events and lost 4–1 to Alan McManus in the quarter-finals of the Yixing Open, with his only frame coming courtesy of a 117 break. At the final event, the Dongguan Open, Yu advanced to the semi-finals where he was beaten 4–2 by Liang Wenbo. His results saw him finish ninth on the Asian Order of Merit to claim the final spot in the Players Tour Championship Finals. There, he exacted revenge over Wenbo by winning their first round clash 4–2. He recorded the best result of his career to date in the next round by restricting reigning world champion Ronnie O'Sullivan to just two points from 3–2 down to win 4–3. In Yu's first ranking event quarter-final of his career, he was unable to recapture his prior form and was beaten 4–1 by Barry Hawkins. Yu continued his recent good play into the China Open with wins against Duane Jones and James Wattana to face Neil Robertson in the third round. The match lasted four hours with Yu just being edged out 5–4.

2014/2015 season
Yu lost in the quarter-finals of the Yixing Open for the second year in a row, this time 4–1 to Ryan Day. He qualified for the Wuxi Classic but was beaten 5–4 by Yan Bingtao in the wildcard round, and lost 6–1 to Shaun Murphy in the opening round of the International Championship. Yu recorded his first win of the year at a ranking event by knocking out Oliver Lines 6–2 in the UK Championship and, though he led 3–0, he would be beaten 6–4 by Stephen Maguire in the second round. He received a bye through to the second round of the Welsh Open and was thrashed 4–0 by Joe Perry. In Yu's deciding frame of his first round match at the Indian Open he led Ben Woollaston 67–0, before the Englishman made a 67 break and won the respotted black. Yu closed out the season with a 5–3 loss to John Higgins in the first round of the China Open and reached the final round of World Championship qualifying where he was defeated 10–7 by Graeme Dott.

2015/2016 season
A 6–1 victory over Chris Melling saw Yu qualify for the International Championship and he knocked out reigning world champion Stuart Bingham 6–2 in the first round. He was edged out 6–5 by Ben Woollaston in the next round. Another second round exit followed at the UK Championship, 6–0 at the hands of Marco Fu. A trio of deciding frame victories over Ian Glover, Ricky Walden and Dechawat Poomjaeng saw Yu reach the last 16 of the Welsh Open, his deepest run a ranking event this season, and he lost 4–1 to Ronnie O'Sullivan. In the first round of the China Open Yu lost 5–2 to Fu and he fell at the first hurdle in World Championship qualifying 10–9 to Paul Davison. He just held on to his top 64 ranking and therefore his tour place as he was 63rd in the world.

2016/2017 season
Yu could not win a first round match in the 2016–17 season until the ninth event when he beat Ding Junhui 4–2 at the Northern Ireland Open, before losing 4–1 to Robbie Williams. He reached the third round of the UK Championship by defeating Nigel Bond 6–3 and Stuart Bingham 6–4, but lost 6–1 to Luca Brecel.
At the Scottish Open, Yu reached the semi-finals for the first time in his career in a ranking tournament, beating Josh Boileau, Mark Joyce, Daniel Wells, Sean O'Sullivan and Liang Wenbo, all in final frame deciders. He was defeated by Marco Fu, the eventual winner of the tournament, 6–1 in the semi-finals. Yu was eliminated 5–3 by Michael White in the first round of the China Open and got through to the final World Championship qualifying round, but lost 10–7 to Martin Gould.

2018/2019 season
On 25 May 2018, he was suspended from the tour for suspected match fixing. After a lengthy investigation, Yu was found guilty of match fixing and received a ban for 10 years and 9 months on 1 December 2018.

Performance and rankings timeline

References

External links

 Yu Delu at worldsnooker.com

1987 births
Chinese snooker players
Living people
Sportspeople from Shanxi
Match fixers
Banned sportspeople